Anton Peikrishvili (born 18 September 1987) is a Georgian rugby union player. His position is prop, and he currently plays for Cardiff Blues in the Pro14 and the Georgia national team.

References

Rugby union players from Georgia (country)
Rugby union props
Living people
1987 births
Rugby union players from Tbilisi
Georgia international rugby union players